Natalia Romero may refer to:
 Natalia Romero (Chilean athlete) (born 1980), Chilean long-distance runner
 Natalia Romero (Spanish athlete) (born 1988), Spanish runner
 Natalia Romero (badminton) (born 1997), Colombian badminton player